McKenzie High School is a public high school in Finn Rock, Oregon, United States.

Academics
In 2008, 92% of the school's seniors received their high school diploma. Of 26 students, 24 graduated, 1 dropped out, and 1 received a modified diploma.

Student Government
Bobby Kennedy was the 7th Grade Class Secretary, Associated Student Body Business Manager, and Sophomore Class President. Bobby ran for Associated Student Body Treasurer in May of 1982 but lost. Bobby still manged to obtain 44.06% of the vote. McKenzie River Reflections Newspaper Article

References

High schools in Lane County, Oregon
Public high schools in Oregon